Agathon of Macedonia may refer to:

Agathon (son of Philotas)
Agathon (son of Tyrimmas)